Antiplanes diomedea is a species of sea snail, a marine gastropod mollusk in the family Pseudomelatomidae.

Description
The length of the shell attains 40.2 mm, its diameter 15.8 mm.

Distribution
This species occurs in the Pacific Ocean off California, USA.

References

 Abbott R. T. (1974). American seashells. The marine Mollusca of the Atlantic and Pacific coast of North America. ed. 2. Van Nostrand, New York. 663 pp., 24 pls

External links
  Bartsch, P, Some turrid mollusks of Monterey Bay and vicinity; Proceedings of the Biological Society of Washington, v. 57 pp. 57–68
 
 

diomedea
Gastropods described in 1944